Terebra nadinae is a species of sea snail, a marine gastropod mollusc in the family Terebridae, the auger snails.

The status of this species is uncertain.

Description

Distribution

References

 Aubry U. 2008. Nuove terebre dall'Angola. Malacologia Mostra Mondiale 59: 14-16

Terebridae
Gastropods described in 2008